General Mahmoud Fehmy (1842/1843 – 1890) was an Egyptian army officer, military engineer, and Egyptian nationalist, who served as Minister of Public Works and Chief Engineer to the Egyptian Army in 1882, during the ʻUrabi revolt.

During the 1882 British invasion of Egypt, Fehmy was given responsibility for military fortifications by the leader of the nationalist government, Ahmed ʻUrabi. In this role, Fehmy oversaw the construction of the Egyptian fortifications at Kafr El Dawwar, and those stormed by the British at the Battle of Tell El Kebir. However, Fehmy did not manage to complete the works at Tell El Kebir, for he was captured by the British at the end of August 1882, while on a walk with a fellow officer. His capture was a serious loss to the Egyptian forces, as Fehmy was widely regarded as a bright and capable officer and engineer.

Fehmy was held as a prisoner of war by the British for the rest of the war. At the end of 1882 he was tried in court alongside ʻUrabi and other nationalist generals, and found guilty of rebellion. Fehmy and his family were deported to Colombo, Ceylon alongside 'Urabi and the other prisoners, where Fehmy died in 1890.

References 

1890 deaths
Egyptian generals
People of the 'Urabi revolt
Egyptian exiles
Egyptian nationalists
Egyptian soldiers
Year of birth uncertain